Benjamin Joshua Chrisene (born 12 January 2004) is an English professional footballer who plays as a left-back for Scottish Premiership club Kilmarnock, on loan from Premier League club Aston Villa.

He is a product of the Exeter City academy and made five first-team appearances during the 2019–20 season, at the age of fifteen. He subsequently was signed by Aston Villa in August 2020 and joined their academy side, before making his senior debut in January 2021. Chrisene has represented England at youth level, appearing at under-15, under-16, under-17 and under-19 levels.

Club career

Exeter City
Chrisene began his career with Exeter City at the age of 11, and was linked with a move to Liverpool in the summer of 2018.

He made his debut for Exeter City on 13 August 2019, in the EFL Cup against Coventry City, at the age of 15 years, 7 months, and 1 day, becoming the club's youngest ever player, beating Ethan Ampadu's record.

He made his league debut as a late substitute in a 2–0 home win against Cambridge United on 11 January 2020.

Aston Villa
On 19 August 2020, Chrisene joined Premier League side Aston Villa for an undisclosed fee, initially joining their academy. On 17 November 2020, Chrisene made his debut for Aston Villa in a 3–1 defeat to Carlisle United as part of an invited Under-21 squad in the EFL Trophy. Chrisene was named in the Aston Villa starting line-up for his senior debut on 8 January 2021 in an FA Cup third round tie against Liverpool. A few days later he signed his first professional contract.

On 24 May 2021, Chrisene was part of the Aston Villa squad that lifted the FA Youth Cup. Chrisene scored the opening goal as Villa beat Liverpool U18s 2–1 in the final.

On 24 January 2022, Chrisene signed a new contract with Aston Villa, with manager Steven Gerrard saying he was "excited" to help him become a Premier League player. On 9 February, Chrisene featured in a Premier League squad for the first time, as an unused substitute in a 3–3 draw against Leeds United.

On 25 August 2022, Chrisene signed for Scottish Premiership club Kilmarnock on a season-long loan. Chrisene made his debut for Kilmarnock on 27 August 2022, playing 90 minutes in a 2–1 home victory over Motherwell.

International career
Chrisene has represented England at under-15, under-16, and under-17 youth levels.

On 21 September 2022, Chrisene made his England U19 debut during a 2–0 2023 U19 EURO qualifying win over Montenegro in Denmark.

Career statistics

Honours 

Aston Villa U18
FA Youth Cup: 2020–21

References

2004 births
Living people
English footballers
Association football fullbacks
Exeter City F.C. players
Aston Villa F.C. players
English Football League players
England youth international footballers
Kilmarnock F.C. players
Scottish Professional Football League players